Teller County is a county located in the U.S. state of Colorado. As of the 2020 census, the population was 24,710. The county seat is Cripple Creek, and the most populous city is Woodland Park.

Teller County is included in the Colorado Springs, CO Metropolitan Statistical Area.

History
A few years after gold was discovered in Cripple Creek, political differences between area miners and mine owners, many of whom lived in Colorado Springs, resulted in the division of El Paso County. Created  in 1899, Teller County was carved from the western slope of Pikes Peak, and was named after United States Senator Henry M. Teller. Within five years of its formation, Teller County became the scene of a dramatic labor struggle called the Colorado Labor Wars.

Geography

Adjacent counties
Douglas County - north
Jefferson County - north
El Paso County - east
Fremont County - south
Park County - west

Major Highways
  U.S. Highway 24
  State Highway 67

National protected areas
Cripple Creek National Historic District
Florissant Fossil Beds National Monument
Pike National Forest

State protected area
Mueller State Park

Trails and byways
American Discovery Trail
Gold Belt Tour National Scenic and Historic Byway

Historic places 

 See List of National Register of Historic Places Listings in Teller County

Demographics

At the 2000 census there were 20,555 people in 7,993 households, including 5,922 families, in the county.  The population density was 37 people per square mile (14/km2).  There were 10,362 housing units at an average density of 19 per square mile (7/km2).  The racial makeup of the county was 94.92% White, 0.55% Black or African American, 0.97% Native American, 0.58% Asian, 0.08% Pacific Islander, 0.90% from other races, and 2.00% from two or more races.  3.49% of the population were Hispanic or Latino of any race.
Of the 7,993 households 33.60% had children under the age of 18 living with them, 64.20% were married couples living together, 6.60% had a female householder with no husband present, and 25.90% were non-families. 19.60% of households were one person and 4.00% were one person aged 65 or older.  The average household size was 2.56 and the average family size was 2.94.

The age distribution was 25.90% under the age of 18, 5.60% from 18 to 24, 31.20% from 25 to 44, 29.80% from 45 to 64, and 7.50% 65 or older.  The median age was 39 years. For every 100 females there were 102.70 males.  For every 100 females age 18 and over, there were 100.90 males.

The median income for a household in the county was $50,165, and the median family income  was $57,071. Males had a median income of $37,194 versus $26,934 for females. The per capita income for the county was $23,412.  About 3.40% of families and 5.40% of the population were below the poverty line, including 6.90% of those under age 18 and 4.20% of those age 65 or over.

Politics

Communities

Cities
Cripple Creek
Victor
Woodland Park

Town
Green Mountain Falls (partly in El Paso County)

Census-designated places
Divide
Florissant
Goldfield
Midland

Unincorporated communities 

 Crystola (Partly in El Paso county)

Gallery

See also

Outline of Colorado
Index of Colorado-related articles
Colorado census statistical areas
Front Range Urban Corridor
National Register of Historic Places listings in Teller County, Colorado

References

External links
 Teller County Profile & Community Bulletin Board
Teller County Government website
Teller County Information & Links
Teller County Online Yellow Pages
Teller County Real Estate Information
Colorado County Evolution by Don Stanwyck
Colorado Historical Society

 

 
Colorado counties
1899 establishments in Colorado
Populated places established in 1899